Muzzle law may refer to:
 Maulkuerfgesetz, a proposed law in Luxembourg in 1937
 Polish judicial disciplinary panel law, 2019 Polish law